Vysoky is a rural locality (a khutor) in Karayashnikovskoye Rural Settlement, Olkhovatsky District, Voronezh Oblast, Russia. The population was 50 as of 2010.

Geography 
Vysoky is located 33 km north of Olkhovatka (the district's administrative centre) by road. Rybny is the nearest rural locality.

References 

Rural localities in Olkhovatsky District